Schönwalde-Glien is a municipality in the Havelland district, in Brandenburg, Germany.

History
The municipality shared its borders with the former West Berlin, and so during the period 1961-1990 it was separated from it by the Berlin Wall.

In 1951–2, the Havel Canal was constructed through the municipality to link Hennigsdorf with Paretz, thus avoiding a passage through the reach of the River Havel, between Spandau and Potsdam, that was under the political control of West Berlin. The single lock on the canal is located at Schönwalde. The canal is still in use, providing a shorter route for shipping from west of Berlin to the Oder–Havel Canal and Poland.

Geography 
The municipality covers an area mainly north of the Havel Canal, north west of Spandau Forest (Berlin-Spandau) and about 10 km north east of Nauen. Only its most densely populated quarter, Schönwalde-Siedlung, is situated south of the Havel Canal and shares an immediate border with Berlin-Spandau. Schönwalde-Glien is part of the Osthavelland-Spandau Regional Park and formerly the Krämer Forst Regional Park. The municipality is situated at the south eastern fringes of the Glien ground moraine and encompasses part of the Krämer Forest in the north.

Administrative division 
The Schönwalde-Glien consists of following quarters:
 Grünefeld (470)
 Paaren im Glien (634)
 Pausin (931)
 Perwenitz (474)
 Schönwalde-Dorf (938)
 Schönwalde-Siedlung (5,034)
 Wansdorf (877)
(inhabitants as of 31 December 2014 according to the web site of the municipality)

Demography

References

Localities in Havelland